2017 Thai League 4 Northeastern Region is the 9th season of the League competition since its establishment in 2009. It is in the 4th tier of the Thai football league system.

Changes from last season

Team changes

Promoted clubs

Five club was promoted to the 2017 Thai League 3 Upper Region.
 Udon Thani
 Ubon Ratchathani
 Kalasin
 Khon Kaen
 Amnat United

Relegated clubs
 Nakhon Phanom Relegated to 2016 Thai Division 3 Tournament Northeastern Region

Relocated clubs
 Loei City R-Airlines were moved from the Northern Region 2016
 Mashare Chaiyaphum were moved from the Central Region 2016
 Pattaya City were moved from the Eastern Region 2016

Expansion clubs
 Wang Saphung Promoted from the 2016 Thai Division 3 Tournament Northeastern Region

Renamed clubs
 Mukdahan Lamkhong was renamed to  Mukdahan Chaiyuenyong
 Wang Saphung was renamed to Muang Loei United
 Nakhon Ratchasima Huai Thalaeng United authorize from Pattaya City

Withdrawn clubs
 Nong Khai is taking a 1-year break.

Reserving clubs
 Buriram United B is Buriram United Reserving this team which join Northeastern Region first time.

Teams

Stadium and locations

League table

Results 1st and 2nd match for each team

Results 3rd match for each team
In the third leg, the winner on head-to-head result of the first and the second leg will be home team. If head-to-head result are tie, must to find the home team from head-to-head goals different. If all of head-to-head still tie, must to find the home team from penalty kickoff on the end of each second leg match (This penalty kickoff don't bring to calculate points on league table, it's only the process to find the home team on third leg).

Season statistics

Top scorers
As of 9 September 2017.

Attendance

See also
 2017 Thai League
 2017 Thai League 2
 2017 Thai League 3
 2017 Thai League 4
 2017 Thailand Amateur League
 2017 Thai FA Cup
 2017 Thai League Cup
 2017 Thailand Champions Cup

References

External links
 Thai League 4
 http://www.thailandsusu.com/webboard/index.php?topic=379167.0

4